August Ferdinand Tammekann (until 1921 Jürgenson; 14 September 1894 Tallinn – 23 February 1959 Heinola, Finland) was an Estonian geographer.

In 1923 he graduated from Tartu University. Since 1926 he taught at Tartu University. During the Tartu years he lived in famous Villa Tammekann, projected in 1936 by Alvar Aalto.

In 1940 he fled to Finland. Between 1942 and 1959, intermittently, he worked at Helsinki University.

His main fields of research were Estonian geomporpholoy, paleogeography, population distribution. He was also interested in local history.

Works

References

1894 births
1959 deaths
Estonian geographers